Cecilia Ngibo Nku (born 26 October 1992) is a Nigerian  footballer  who plays as a midfielder for Rivers Angels of the Nigerian Women's Championship.

International career
Nku had her first international action in 2010 while playing for Nigeria in the 2010 FIFA U-20 Women's World Cup. She was part of the senior Nigerian squad which won the 2014 African Women's Championship in Namibia.
In May 2015 Nku was called up to play for team Nigeria in the 2015 FIFA Women's World Cup.

Honours

International
 Nigeria
 African Women's Championship (1): 2014

References

External links
 
 

1992 births
Living people
Rivers Angels F.C. players
Nigerian women's footballers
Nigeria women's international footballers
2015 FIFA Women's World Cup players
Women's association football midfielders